Mallemala Sundara Rami Reddy (15 August 1924 – 11 December 2011), popularly known as M. S. Reddy and Mallemala, was an Indian film producer, director, screen writer and lyricist in Telugu cinema and a writer known for his contribution to Telugu Literature. He also served as President of the Telugu Film Producers Council, South Indian Film Writers Association, and Film Nagar Co-operative Housing Society, as well as Chairman of Andhra Pradesh Film Development Corporation. He won two Nandi Awards.

Early life
M. S. Reddy was born in the village of Alimili, near to Nellore. His date of birth is usually given as 15 August 1924. He died at the age of 87 at his home in Film Nagar, Hyderabad, the city that he had been instrumental in making the hub of the Telugu cinema industry.

Aside from his work, Reddy was also a campaigner for various social causes and had Gandhian views. Telugu film producer Shyam Prasad Reddy is his son.

Career

Reddy began his career with a photographic studio in Chennai. His first movie was dubbed version of  Kanne Pilla, in 1966, and his first production was the 1968 film, Bharya. He then produced many other movies, such as Srikrishna Vijayam (1971), Ooriki Upakari (1972) Kodenaagu (1974), Ramayya Thandri (1974) Doralu Dongalu (1976), Mutayala Pallaki (1977), Naidu Bava (1978), Thathayya Premaleelalu (1980), Eklavya (1982), Kalyana Veena (1983), Palnati Simham (1985), O Prema Katha (1986), Aahuthi (1987), Ankusam (1989), Ammoru (1995), and Ramayanam (1997). He also wrote poetry and was an artist.

Awards
Nandi Awards
 Best Lyricist - Ankusam (1989)
 Best Childrens Film - Gold - Ramayanam (1997)

See also
 Raghupathi Venkaiah Award

References 

1924 births
2011 deaths
Film producers from Andhra Pradesh
Telugu screenwriters
People from Nellore district
Film directors from Andhra Pradesh
20th-century Indian film directors
Screenwriters from Andhra Pradesh
Producers who won the Best Children's Film National Film Award